In Canada, a dime is a coin worth ten cents. It has been the physically smallest Canadian coin since 1922; it is smaller even than the penny, despite its higher face value. According to the Royal Canadian Mint, the official national term of the coin is the 10-cent piece, but in practice, the term dime predominates in English-speaking Canada. It is nearly identical in size to the American dime. Unlike its American counterpart, the Canadian dime is magnetic due to a distinct metal composition. From 1968 to 1999, it was composed entirely of nickel, and since 2000, it has consisted of a steel core with plating composed of layers of nickel and copper.

Currently the dime has, as with all Canadian coins, a portrait of Queen Elizabeth II on the obverse. The reverse contains a representation of the Bluenose, a famous Canadian schooner. According to the Royal Canadian Mint, "Artist Emanuel Hahn developed his design for the 10-cent coin from photos of the famous Bluenose schooner." The coin is produced by the Royal Canadian Mint at its facility in Winnipeg.

The word dime comes from the French word dîme, meaning "tithe" or "tenth part", from the Latin decima [pars].

History of composition

Commemorative editions

Other notable dates 

 1936 dot: Extremely rare with only 5 known. There are 3 in private collections, one graded Specimen-63 and 2 examples graded SP-68. The other 2 are in the Ottawa currency museum. The most recent of these to sell at auction was one of the SP68 coins, which brought US$184,000 (this does not include taxes) in a Heritage Auction in January 2010.
 1969 large date: Fewer than 20 examples of the large date variety exist. High-grade versions of this coin sell for $15,000 to $30,000. There is only one graded in mint state as of 2012.
1999p: The first Canada 10-cent coin issued with the new plating "P" process. Plated coins are marked with a small "P" beneath the Queen's effigy on the obverse of the coin. Mintage is limited to 20,000 coins.
 2000p: The 2000p Canada dime is scarce with fewer than 250 examples minted. The 2000p dime was lent to the vending industry by the Royal Canadian Mint to test the compatibility of the new plating process of circulation coins with existing vending machines and parking meters. Under contractual obligation, these coins were to be returned to the Mint once the compatibility tests were complete. Of the approximately 250 coins minted, many were not returned to the mint leading to significant debate surrounding the legality of owning these coins. High-grade examples of the 2000p 10-cent issue range from $1,500 to $3,000 CDN. Unlike the 5-cent 2000p issues, the 10-cent coin was not officially released by the Mint, and entered the numismatic market illegally.

First strikes

References

External links
Value of Canadian Nickel

1858 establishments in Canada
Coins of Canada
Canada
Ships on coins